Buergersiochloa is a genus of New Guinean in the grass family.

The only known species is  Buergersiochloa bambusoides.

See also
List of Poaceae genera

References

Bambusoideae
Bambusoideae genera
Monotypic Poaceae genera
Endemic flora of New Guinea
Grasses of Oceania
Taxa named by Robert Knud Friedrich Pilger